James Edward Kelly may refer to:

James E. Kelly (artist) (1855–1933), American sculptor and illustrator who specialized in depicting the American Civil War
Jim Kelly (born 1960), American football quarterback for the Buffalo Bills
Jimmy Kelly (footballer, born 1907) (1907–1984), English professional footballer

See also
James Kelly (disambiguation)